William Taylor Brown was a Republican member of the Montana Legislature. He served Senate District 22, representing Huntley, Montana, since 2009. Due to redistricting he also served District 28. Brown is widely known as an on-air farm broadcaster. He was mentioned as a possible candidate for the 2012 Montana Governor's race, but did not run.

References

External links
 Home page

Living people
Year of birth missing (living people)
Republican Party Montana state senators
Montana State University alumni
People from Garfield County, Montana
People from Yellowstone County, Montana
21st-century American politicians